The violet worm snake (Indotyphlops violaceus) is a species of snake in the Typhlopidae family.

References

Indotyphlops
Reptiles described in 1947